The 1897 Illinois Fighting Illini football team was an American football team that represented the University of Illinois during the 1897 Western Conference football season.  In their third season under head coach George Huff, the Illini compiled a 6–2 record and finished in fourth place in the Western Conference. Tackle Don Sweney was the team captain.

Schedule

Roster

References

Illinois
Illinois Fighting Illini football seasons
Illinois Fighting Illini football